Chipani cha Pfuko (CCP) was a political party in Malawi led by Davis Katsonga.

History
The party was established in 2012. In the 2014 general elections it put forward Katsonga as its presidential candidate. He finished last in a field of 12 candidates, with 0.1% of the vote. The party also won one seat in the National Assembly. The party disbanded when Katsonga joined the Democratic Progressive Party in July 2014.

References

Defunct political parties in Malawi
Political parties established in 2012
2012 establishments in Malawi
Political parties disestablished in 2014
2014 disestablishments in Malawi